The 2018–19 Úrvalsdeild kvenna was the 62nd season of the Úrvalsdeild kvenna, the top tier women's basketball league on Iceland. The season started on 3 October 2018 and concluded on 27 April 2019 with Valur winning their first title after beating Keflavík 3–0 in the Úrvalsdeild finals.

Competition format
The participating teams first play a conventional round-robin schedule with every team playing each opponent twice "home" and twice "away" for a total of 28 games. The top four teams qualify for the championship playoffs whilst the bottom team will be relegated to 1. deild kvenna.

Teams

Managerial changes

Regular season

Playoffs
The playoffs are played between the four first qualified teams with a 1-1-1-1-1 format, playing seeded teams games 1, 3 and 5 at home.

Bracket

Updated to match(es) played on 27 April 2019. Source: KKÍ

Semifinals

|}

Final

|}

Notable occurrences
On June 16, reigning Úrvalsdeild Domestic Player of the Year Helena Sverrisdóttir left Haukar and signed with Ceglédi EKK of the Hungarian Nemzeti Bajnokság I/A.
On June 25, reigning Úrvalsdeild Foreign Player of the Year Danielle Rodriguez resigned with Stjarnan.
On June 30, Haukar signed former Úrvalsdeild Foreign Player of the Year Lele Hardy.
On August 14, Breiðablik signed former WNBA player Kelly Faris.
On September 5, Stjarnan signed Argentinian national team player Florencia Palacios who spent the previous season in the Swedish Basketligan dam.
On September 14, it was reported that KR had signed former Torpan Pojat player Kiana Johnson.
On October 31, Brittanny Dinkins scored a career-high 51 points for Keflavík against Breiðablik, including Keflavík's last 14 points in the 85–78 victory.
On October 31, Danielle Rodriguez was one steal away from a quadruple-double in a victory against Valur. She finished the game with 23 points, 12 rebounds, 13 assists and 9 steals.
On November 1, it was reported that Valur had released American Brooke Johnson who had averaged 16.5 points, 9.4 rebounds and 3.2 assists per game. In her place, the club signed Heather Butler who last played for Uppsala Basket in the Basketligan dam.
On November 2, Breiðablik announced that star center Isabella Ósk Sigurðardóttir would miss the rest of the season after tearing her Anterior cruciate ligament on practice. She had been averaging 9.6 points, 10.8 rebounds and league leading 2.2 blocks for the season. In her place, Breiðablik signed Sanja Orozović.
On November 14, Margrét Sturlaugsdóttir resigned from her post as head coach of Breiðablik for health reasons.
On November 15, 2018,  reigning Úrvalsdeild Domestic Player of the Year, Helena Sverrisdóttir, signed with Valur.
On November 24, Breiðablik defeated Haukar for its first win of the season, breaking its 8-game losing streak.
On December 20, it was reported that Stjarnan had released Florencia Palacios who had averaged 11.8 points and 4.0 rebounds while shooting 34.8% from the three-point range in 12 games for the club.
On December 21, Haukar signed Dutch national team player Janine Guijt for the rest of the season.
On January 3, Breiðablik announced that it had signed Florencia Palacios who had been released by Stjarnan in December.
On January 9, Stjarnan and Icelandic national team player Ragna Margrét Brynjarsdóttir played her first game since suffering a concussion during a game on 3 February 2018, scoring 7 points in 12 minutes in a loss against Keflavík.
On February 6, Kiana Johnson scored 50 points for KR in a 102–81 victory against Breiðablik. She also had 16 rebounds and 10 assists.
On February 6, Unnur Tara Jónsdóttir of KR and the Icelandic national team suffered a knee injury in a victory against Breiðablik and was initially ruled out for the rest of the season.
On 11 April, KR's Ástrós Lena Ægisdóttir tied the Úrvalsdeild playoffs record for most three pointers in a game when she made 7 three point shots in a victory against Valur.

References

External links
Official Icelandic Basketball Federation website

Icelandic
Lea
Úrvalsdeild kvenna seasons (basketball)